Makati Avenue is a major commercial thoroughfare in Makati, Metro Manila, Philippines. It forms the eastern border of Ayala Triangle and is one of the three main avenues of the Makati Central Business District. The avenue runs in a somewhat north–south diagonal direction almost parallel with Epifanio de los Santos Avenue (EDSA). It passes through two distinct neighborhoods of the city: the Makati CBD and the old Makati Población. At its northern end lies the older part of Makati starting from J.P. Rizal Avenue. It continues through Población to Gil Puyat Avenue, marking the southern edge of the old district. South of Gil Puyat onto the CBD, the avenue becomes more commercial and upscale. The shopping hub of Ayala Center and Arnaiz Avenue lie at its southern end.

Makati Avenue has two lanes each way in the Poblacion area, widening to three or four in the CBD. It has a short extension into the gated San Lorenzo Village as San Lorenzo Drive.

History

The avenue served as the primary access road to the old Nielson Field airport from San Pedro de Macati. It was known as Culi-Culi Road which also led to the barrio of Culi-Culi (now Pio del Pilar) just west of Nielson Field. After the airport was closed down after World War II, its two runways were converted into wide roads known today as Ayala Avenue and Paseo de Roxas. The airport's control tower was preserved and is now a library called Filipinas Heritage Library. This library is located along the avenue at the southeast corner of Ayala Triangle.

Makati Avenue, particularly its northern segment in Poblacion, has a history of prostitution. The areas around P. Burgos Street with its nightclubs, bars and budget hotels are considered by many as the red light district of Makati. At present, however, the area is undergoing gentrification with the completion of several new commercial developments including the Century City mall and complex.

Intersections

Points of interest

Makati Avenue is a retail and entertainment hub of Makati. At its south end, the avenue bisects the Ayala Center, separating Glorietta, The Landmark department store and The Link shopping mall from the more upscale Greenbelt shopping center. This section of the avenue also hosts the Ayala Museum, Greenbelt Chapel, as well as several luxury hotels such as the Makati Shangri-La, Manila, Fairmont Hotel Manila, Raffles Hotel Manila, and New World Makati Hotel. The stretch from Ayala Avenue to Gil Puyat Avenue is the site of the Ayala Triangle Gardens, which houses the Old Nielson Tower and the future Park Central Towers. This section of the avenue also hosts The Peninsula Manila, Zuellig Building, Pacific Star Building, as well as several other office buildings.

North of Gil Puyat are more hotels and commercial establishments, particularly near the intersection with Kalayaan Avenue. The A. Venue Mall and Century City Mall are located in this area, as well as Gramercy Residences, Trump Tower Manila, Berjaya Makati Hotel, I'M Hotel Makati, St. Giles Hotel and Best Western Antel. The Sts. Peter and Paul Parish Church and Saint Paul College of Makati can be accessed by turning east onto Valdez Street before reaching J.P. Rizal Avenue and the Makati–Mandaluyong Bridge.

Notes

References

Streets in Metro Manila
Shopping districts and streets in Metro Manila